piauí is a Brazilian culture magazine, created by the documentarian João Moreira Salles. It is edited by Editora Alvinegra and printed and distributed by Editora Abril.  The first edition of piauí was launched in October 2006.

Piauí is also the name of a Brazilian state in the northeastern part of the country.

These are the main sections in piauí nowadays:

 Chegada (Arrival)
 Colaboradores (Collaborators)
 Esquina (Corner)
 Diário (Journal)
 Poesia (Poetry)
 Cartas (Letters)
 Perfil (Profile)
 Quadrinhos (Comics)
 Ficção (Fiction)
 Concurso (Literary contest)
 Tipos brasileiros (Brazilian characters)
 Despedida (Farewell)

External links
 piauí magazine website 
 Texto caudaloso, aposta na leitura in Observatório da Imprensa 

2006 establishments in Brazil
Magazines published in Brazil
Monthly magazines published in Brazil
Cultural magazines
Magazines established in 2006
Mass media in Rio de Janeiro (city)
Portuguese-language magazines